The Deering Bridge, near Sutton, Nebraska, is a historic bridge that was built in 1916.  It is a concrete spandrel arch bridge designed by the Nebraska Bureau of Roads & Bridges and built by the Lincoln Construction Co.  Also known as School Creek Bridge and as NEHBS No. CY00-11, it was listed on the National Register of Historic Places in 1992.

It is an exemplary  concrete arch bridge, which the Nebraska State Engineer commended as a well-constructed bridge of this type. Prior to the construction of the bridge, Clay County had mainly built wooden and steel bridges; however, after building the Deering Bridge it gradually shifted to constructing concrete bridges. The bridge extends between Clay County and Fillmore County.

External links 
More photos of the Deering Bridge at Wikimedia Commons

References

Road bridges on the National Register of Historic Places in Nebraska
Bridges completed in 1916
Buildings and structures in Clay County, Nebraska
Buildings and structures in Fillmore County, Nebraska
National Register of Historic Places in Fillmore County, Nebraska
National Register of Historic Places in Clay County, Nebraska
Arch bridges in the United States
Concrete bridges in the United States